Department of Medical Research(DMR) is the department of Myanmar Health Ministry to undertake research that contributes to the improvement of the health of the people of Myanmar.

References

Government of Myanmar